Abdallah Sharia Ameir (born 3 February 1963) is a Tanzanian CCM politician and Member of Parliament for Dimani constituency since 2010.

References

1963 births
Living people
Chama Cha Mapinduzi MPs
Tanzanian MPs 2010–2015